Eurema is a widespread genus of grass yellow butterflies in the family Pieridae.

Species range from Asia, Africa, Australia, and Oceania, to the New World. The type species is the North American barred yellow (Eurema daira).

There are over 70 species in the genus, but more than 300 synonymous names have been applied to them. Some species, such as the common African grass yellow (E. hecabe) have over 80 synonyms. The genus itself has over 15 junior generic synonyms. This is the price of being a widespread taxon, as well as a zoogeographical problem.

Species 
Listed alphabetically within groups:
 Eurema ada (Distant & Pryer, 1887)
 Eurema alitha (C.& R. Felder, 1862) – scalloped grass yellow
 Eurema andersonii (Moore, 1886) – one-spot grass yellow
 Eurema beatrix (Toxopeus, 1939)
 Eurema blanda (Boisduval, 1836) – three-spot grass yellow
 Eurema brigitta (Stoll, [1780]) – small grass yellow or no brand grass yellow
 Eurema candida (Stoll, [1782])
 Eurema celebensis Wallace, 1867
 Eurema desjardinsii (Boisduval, 1833) – angled grass yellow
 ?Eurema ecriva (Butler, 1873)
 Eurema esakii Shirôzu, 1953
 Eurema floricola (Boisduval, 1883) – Malagasy grass yellow
 ?Eurema halmaherana Shirôzu & Yata, 1981
 Eurema hapale (Mabille, 1882) – pale grass yellow or marsh grass yellow
 Eurema hecabe (Linnaeus, 1758) – common grass yellow
 Eurema herla (Macleay, 1826) – pink grass yellow
 ?Eurema hiurae Shirozu & Yata, 1977
 Eurema lacteola (Distant, 1886) – scarce grass yellow
 Eurema laeta (Boisduval, [1836]) – spotless grass yellow
 Eurema lombokiana Fruhstorfer, 1897
 Eurema mandarinula (Holland, 1892) – mandarin grass yellow
 Eurema mentawiensis Corbet, 1942
 Eurema novapallida Yata, 1992
 Eurema nilgiriensis Yata, 1990 – Nilgiri grass yellow
 Eurema puella (Boisduval, 1832) – broad-margined grass yellow
 Eurema regularis (Butler, 1876) – regular grass yellow
 Eurema sari (Horsfield, [1829]) – chocolate grass yellow
 Eurema sarilata Semper, 1891
 Eurema senegalensis Boisduval, [1836] – forest grass yellow
 Eurema simulatrix (Semper, 1891) – changeable grass yellow
 Eurema smilax (Donovan, 1805) – small grass yellow
 Eurema tilaha (Horsfield, [1829])
 Eurema nicevillei (Butler, 1898) – Malayan grass yellow
 Eurema timorensis Shirôzu & Yata, 1977
 Eurema tominia (Vollenhoven, 1865)
 Eurema upembana (Berger, 1981)
 Eurema zamida (Fruhstorfer, 1908)
Species group: 
 Eurema adamsi (Lathy, 1898)
 Eurema agave (Cramer, [1775])
 Eurema albula (Cramer, [1776]) – ghost yellow
 Eurema amelia (Poey, [1832])
 Eurema arbela Geyer, [1832]
 Eurema daira (Godart, [1819]) (type species) – barred yellow, fairy yellow, or barred sulphur
 Eurema deva (Doubleday, 1847)
 Eurema elathea  (Cramer, [1777])
 Eurema fabiola (C. & R. Felder, 1861)
 Eurema lirina (Bates, 1861)
 Eurema lucina (Poey, [1852])
 Eurema mexicana (Boisduval, [1836]) – Mexican yellow
 Eurema nigrocincta Dognin, 1889
 Eurema paulina (Bates, 1861)
 Eurema phiale (Cramer, [1775])
 Eurema reticulata (Butler, 1871)
 Eurema salome (C. & R. Felder, 1861) – Salome yellow
 Eurema tupuntenem Lichy, 1976
 Eurema xantochlora (Kollar, 1850) – tropical yellow
Species group abaeis:
 Eurema nicippe (Cramer, [1779])
 Eurema nicippiformis Munroe, 1947
Species group pyrisitia:
 Eurema chamberlaini Butler, 1897
 Eurema dina (Poey, 1832) – bush sulphur or dina yellow
 Eurema euterpiformis Munroe, 1947
 Eurema leuce (Boisduval, 1836) – Hall's sulphur
 Eurema lisa (Boisduval & Leconte, 1829) – little yellow
 Eurema messalina (Fabricius, 1787) – shy yellow
 Eurema nise (Cramer, [1775]) – mimosa yellow
 Eurema portoricensis (Dewitz, 1877)  – Puerto Rican yellow
 Eurema proterpia (Fabricius, 1775) – tailed orange or little jaune
 Eurema pyro (Godart, 1819)
 Eurema venusta (Boisduval, 1836)
Species group teriocolias:
 Eurema zelia (Lucas, 1852)
Unknown species group
Eurema doris (Röber, 1909)
Eurema irena Corbet & Pendlebury, 1932
Eurema ormistoni (Watkins, 1925)
Eurema raymundoi (D'Almeida, 1928)
Eurema tondana (Felder, C & R Felder, 1865)

References

External links 
	

Pteron Images of Eurema, in Japanese but with binomial names.
Seitz, A. Die Gross-Schmetterlinge der Erde 13: Die Afrikanischen Tagfalter. Plate XIII 22

 
Coliadinae
Pieridae genera
Taxa named by Jacob Hübner